Fellows of the Royal Society elected in 1799.

Fellows

 Archibald Blair (1752–1815), E.I.C astronomer
 David Carnegie (1753–1805)
 James Clark (1755–1817), Scottish physician
 Reginald Cocks (1777–1805)
 William Drummond (c.1770–1828), diplomat
 Edward Hyde East (1764–1847), barrister
 Philip Hills
 Edward Charles Howard (1774–1816)
 Abraham Mills (c.1750–1828), geologist
 Home Riggs Popham (1762–1820), Royal Navy officer
 Apollon Moussin Puschkin (d. 1805), Russian mineralogist
 Edward Roberts (c.1763–1848), physician
 Joseph Sabine (1770–1837), barrister
 John Stuart, 1st Marquess of Bute (1744–1814)

References

1799 in science
1799
1799 in Great Britain